Bobrov, or Bobrova (feminine; Бобро́ва) is a Russian surname, derived from the word "бобер" (beaver). Notable people with the surname include:

Alexander Bobrov (1850–1904), Russian surgeon
Fyodor Bobrov (1898–1944), Soviet army officer and Hero of the Soviet Union
Leonid Bobrov (1920–1988), Soviet aircraft pilot and Hero of the Soviet Union
Nikolay Alexandrovich Bobrov (1921–1942), Soviet aircraft pilot and Hero of the Soviet Union
Nikolay Galaktionovich Bobrov (1923–1943), Soviet army officer and Hero of the Soviet Union
Semyon Bobrov (1767/8–1810), Russian poet
Viktor Bobrov (ice hockey) (born 1984), Russian ice hockey player
Viktor Bobrov (painter) (1842–1918), Russian painter
Vladimir Bobrov (born 1953), Kazakhstani politician 
Vladimir Ivanovich Bobrov (1915–1970), Soviet aircraft pilot and Hero of the Soviet Union, Spanish Republican Air Force air ace
Vsevolod Bobrov (1922–1979), Russian hockey and football player, trainer
Yelisey Bobrov (1778–1830), Russian actor
Yevgeny Bobrov (1867–1933), Russian philosopher
Yevgeny Grigoryevich Bobrov (1902–1983), Russian botanist
Ekaterina Bobrova (born 1990), Russian ice dancer
Lidia Bobrova (born 1952), Russian film director

Russian-language surnames